Hath-Set is a DC Comics supervillain created by Gardner Fox and Dennis Neville. The character is the archenemy of Hawkman and Hawkgirl.

Publication history
Hath-Set first appeared in Flash Comics #1 and was created by Gardner Fox and Dennis Neville.

Fictional character biography
Hath-Set, a cruel Egyptian priest, first appeared in Flash Comics (issue #1,  January 1940). He leads a rebellion and captures and murders Prince Khufu and Priestess Chay-Ara. He kills them with a cursed dagger which has been forged from Nth Metal. This results in a cycle where all three are reincarnated together. In many different incarnations over the centuries, Hath-Set murders the Prince and Priestess.

Doctor Hastor
In the World War II era, Hath-Set is reincarnated as the evil Doctor Anton Hastor. Hawkman (the Prince) and Hawkgirl (the Priestess) are reunited while facing Hastor. Hastor (Hath-Set) is Hawkman's first foe. In 1941, Hastor kidnaps some prominent scientists. He pools their talents and knowledge to build a flying mechanical eye airship, with weaponry capable of leveling whole cities. His plans for world conquest are foiled by Hawkman and the All-Star Squadron. However, Hastor kidnaps Hawkgirl and then is killed by Hawkman with a crossbow.

Infinity Inc.
Infinity Inc is a story line set in the 1980s. Using a curse, Hath-Set takes over an Infinitor called Hector Hall, aka the Silver Scarab. Hall is the son of the Prince and Princess (who are now called Carter Hall and Shiera Hall). With Hector Hall under his control, Hath-Set attacks the team. The team defeat Hath-Set but Hector Hall dies. He is subsequently resurrected in the guise of Sandman in the Dream Dimension, taking over from the previous user of that name, Garrett Sanford.

Helene Astar
In his most recent incarnation, Hath-Set is a spirit who can take control of the minds and bodies of his own descendants. The Hawks travel to the Himalayas to search for Speed Saunders. Hath-Set has taken over a woman called "Helene Astar". In attempting to kill the Hawks, Astar dies. The Hawks believe that Astar was a reincarnation of Hath-Set and that Hath-Set has been permanently killed. Hath-Set goes on to make a plot with the villainous businessman Kristopher Roderic to kill Hawkman.

Alliance with Khea
In the "Brightest Day" storyline, Hath-Set is living in the jungles of Peru. He is allied with "Queen Shrike" the ruler of "Hawkworld", who is Hawkgirl's mother, Khea. Hath-Set and Khea were lovers in ancient Egypt. They created their own immortality using the blood of Hawkman and Hawkgirl, together with the Nth dagger. Hath-Set has collected the remains of all of Hawkman and Hawkgirl's past bodies. He has used them to build a mystical gateway. Hawkman and Hawkgirl follow Hath-Set through this gateway to Hawkworld. Hawkgirl is captured by Hath-Set and Khea. The Entity (White Lantern Corps) tells Hawkgirl she must prevent Hath-Set from killing Hawkman. Hath-Set ties Hawkgirl to the mystical gateway. Following Khea's orders, Hath-Set strikes Hawkgirl in order to lure Hawkman. Hawkman arrives and distracts Hath-Set. Hawkgirl then uses her legs to kill Hath-Set by snapping the evil priest's neck.

DC Rebirth
In "DC Rebirth" as part of the "Dark Nights: Metal" storyline, Hat-Seth was born in prehistoric times. His life was a mixture of lies and half-truths woven by Barbatos. After an encounter with a time-displaced Batman, Hat-Seth founded the Judas Tribe which was also called the Bat Tribe. Hath-Set led it into war against the other tribes including the Bird Tribe. The Judas Tribe caused this war to bring Barbatos to Earth. Hath-Set made a weapon out of Nth Metal to slay the Chieftain of the Bird Tribe and his wife. After doing that, the Nth Metal weapon caused them to confront their reincarnations following his unseen death. In Ancient Egypt, Hath-Set was the servant of Prince Khufu and Chay-Ara. Using Nth Metal from a crashed Thanagarian ship, Hath-Set killed Prince Khufu and Chay-Ara. Using sorcery, he had made sure that they did not remember their lives before Ancient Egypt when they next reincarnated. Carter Hall had a vision of Hat-Seth in Ancient Egypt while experience visions of the future that revolve around Batman.

Hath-Set returns in the pages of Hawkman. When Hawkman and Hawkwoman are reincarnated for a final time as their Golden Age incarnations, Anton Hastor realises that the cycle of reincarnation has been broken and he will be able to finally kill his ancient enemies for good and pass on to the afterlife. He steals his Nth Metal dagger from the JSA Brownstone and uses it to telepathically contact Hawkman. He murders the passengers of an entire train and raises them as zombies via necromancy. Hawkman is initially paralysed by his fear of death, but overcomes it and disarms Hastor by stabbing himself with the dagger. He destroys the dagger and Hastor commits suicide by standing on a collapsing railway bridge. Hath-Set continues to be reincarnated throughout the centuries and attack the Hawks, each time he is defeated.

Powers and abilities
Hath-Set can reincarnate into different descendants. he is also shown to be an expert at armed combat.

In other media
 Hath-Set appears in Justice League Unlimited episode "Ancient History", voiced by Héctor Elizondo. This version is a loyal subject of Hawkman and Hawkgirl.
 Hath-Set, amalgamated with Vandal Savage, appears in the Arrowverse crossover "Heroes Join Forces", portrayed by Casper Crump.
 Hath-Set appears in the DC Super Hero Girls episode "#TheBirdAndTheBee", voiced by Sean Rohani. This version consistently ruins relationships between Hawkman and Hawkgirl.

References

Ancient astronauts in fiction
Characters created by Gardner Fox
Characters created by Dennis Neville
Comics characters introduced in 1940
DC Comics male supervillains
Egyptian superheroes
Fictional ancient Egyptians
Fictional characters with death or rebirth abilities
Fictional characters with spirit possession or body swapping abilities
Fictional priests and priestesses
Golden Age supervillains
Fiction about reincarnation